Surtur Rising is the eighth studio album by the Swedish melodic death metal band Amon Amarth. It is named after the mythical giant, Surtr. The album was released on 29 March 2011.
The album debuted at number 34 on the American Billboard 200 chart as well as number 19 on the Canadian album charts.

On 27 June 2011, the band released a music video, with footage taken during a live performance in Philadelphia, Pennsylvania and directed by David Brodsky, for the third track on the album, "Destroyer of the Universe".

Reception 

Surtur Rising was released to universal acclaim. Germany's Metal Hammer chose the album as the album of the month in March 2011.

Track listing 

 Digipak edition
The digipack edition includes a 10-track audio CD and a bonus Live DVD.

The length of the last track, "Doom over dead Man", is listed as 7:32 on the back of the album, but skipping to the track or ripping it produces a song length of 5:55. An instrumental part 1:37 long is hidden in the pregap between tracks 9 and 10, which can only be heard by rewinding or playing straight through.

Live DVD
This DVD, included in the digipack and deluxe editions, contains over four hours of live concert footage filmed during the "Bloodshed Over Bochum" concert series in 2008 where Amon Amarth played the first four albums on four successive nights.

Vinyl picture disc editions
A 2-sided vinyl LP picture disc is also available in the North American market with the following 10 tracks, and the European market edition includes a 4-sided vinyl LP picture disc with the following 10 tracks and "Balls to the Wall" (Accept cover) bonus track, with the fourth side etched.

Personnel 
Production and performance credits are adapted from the album liner notes.

Amon Amarth
 Johan Hegg – vocals
 Olavi Mikkonen – lead guitar
 Johan Söderberg – rhythm guitar
 Ted Lundström – bass
 Fredrik Andersson – drums

Production
 Jens Bogren – producer, mixing, mastering
 Urban Näsvall – drumtech
 Martin Jacobsson – orchestral arrangements
 Dark Passenger Orchestra – orchestra
 Tom Thiel – cover artwork
 Thomas Ewerhard – design, layout
 Steve Brown – photos

Guest musicians
 Simon Solomon (Witchcraft) – guitar solo on "The last Stand of Frej" and "A Beast am I"

Charts

References 

2011 albums
Amon Amarth albums
Metal Blade Records albums
Albums produced by Jens Bogren